Sangeeta Bijlani (born 9 July 1960) is an Indian former Bollywood actress, Miss India winner and wife of Mohammad Azharuddin. She started her Bollywood career with a lead role in Qatil (1988) and was one of the three female leads in the film Tridev (1989).

Early life 
Bijlani was born on 9 July 1960 in Bombay, Maharashtra, India into a Sindhi Hindu family.

Modelling and commercials 
Bijlani began modelling at the age of 16. She went on to do many commercials including ads of Nirma and Pond's soap. Sangeeta received her popular name "Bijli" from her modelling days.

Miss India Universe and international recognition 
Bijlani was crowned Miss India Universe Title in 1980. She represented India at the Miss Universe pageant in Seoul, South Korea where she won Best National Costume award designed by her mother Poonam Bijlani.

Bollywood debut and success 
Bijlani made her Bollywood debut in 1987 with Qatil, opposite Aditya Pancholi and then went on to act in Tridev, Hathyar, Jurm, Yodha, Yugandhar, Izzat and Lakshman Rekha. She did a bilingual in Hindi and Kannada opposite Vishnu Vardhan. She was nominated by the Filmfare Award for Best Supporting Actress category for Jurm opposite Vinod Khanna and was directed by Mahesh Bhatt and scripted by Salim Khan. She has also worked with Mahesh Bhatt, Mukul Anand, J.P. Dutta, Rahul Rawail and N. Chandra.

Television career 
Bijlani made her small-screen debut with Chandni - "a tale of power, revenge and love" in early 1996 opposite actor Shahbaz Khan. She also went on to produce Hasna Mat, with Kader Khan on Star Plus and Kinarey Milte Nahi on Zee TV.

Personal life 
Bijlani and Salman Khan started dating each other in 1986 when they were still modelling . Years later, the duo shared hugs and kisses during Salman's 57th birthday.

On 14 November 1996, Bijlani married cricketer Mohammed Azharuddin at a reception at the Taj Mahal Hotel in Mumbai. The marriage ended in a divorce in 2010, reportedly due to Azhar's alleged affair with badminton player Jwala Gutta, which was denied by the player.

Filmography

Television commercial
 1984:  Popular Tv commercial Vicco Turmeric ayurvedic skin cream

In popular culture
A 2016 Bollywood film Azhar, directed by Tony D'Souza, was based on her life and depicts her relationship with her ex-husband and Indian cricketer Mohammad Azharuddin. Bijlani's character was played by Nargis Fakhri in the film. According to media reports, Bijlani was not happy with her portrayal in the film as she was called the "house breaker" and further planned to sue the filmmakers. However, Emran Hashmi the lead actor in the film slammed the media reports that Bijlani is unhappy with her character.

References

External links

1960 births
Living people
Sindhi people
Actresses in Hindi cinema
Indian film actresses
Female models from Mumbai
Femina Miss India winners
Miss Universe 1980 contestants
Actresses from Mumbai
20th-century Indian actresses